The 1924 Copa del Rey Final was the 24th final of the Spanish cup competition, the Copa del Rey. The final was played at Atotxa Stadium, in San Sebastián, on 4 May 1924. Real Unión beat Real Madrid 1–0, winning their third title. The only goal was scored by José Echeveste.

Match details 

|valign="top" width="50%"|

|}

References 

1924
1923–24 in Spanish football
Real Unión matches
Real Madrid CF matches